The National Sports Awards is the collective name given to the six sports awards of Republic of India. It is awarded annually by the Ministry of Youth Affairs and Sports. They are presented by the President of India in the same ceremony at the Rashtrapati Bhavan usually on 29th August each year along with the national adventure award. , a total of two hundred and sixty-six individuals have been awarded the various National Sports Awards in non-Olympic sports. The four awards presented in non-Olympic sports are Major Dhyan Chand Khel Ratna, Arjuna Award, Dhyan Chand Award and Dronacharya Award.

First presented in the year 1961, a total of two hundred and twenty-nine individuals (including one group award to twenty individuals) have been honoured with the Arjuna Award in non-Olympic sports for their "good performance at the international level" over the period of last four years, with two individuals being awarded for their lifetime contribution. First presented in the year 1986, a total of twenty-five coaches have been honoured with the Dronacharya Award in non-Olympic sports for their "outstanding work on a consistent basis and enabling sportspersons to excel in international events" over the period of last four years, with four coaches being awarded in the lifetime contribution category. First presented in the year 1991–1992, a total of nine sportspersons have been honoured with the Rajiv Gandhi Khel Ratna, the highest sporting honour of India, in non-Olympic sports for their "most outstanding performance at the international level" over the period of last four years. First presented in the year 2005, a total of three retired sportspersons have been honoured with the Dhyan Chand Award, the lifetime achievement sporting honour of India, in non-Olympic sports for their "good performance at the international level and their continued contributions to the promotion of sports even after their career as a sportsperson is over." One awardee Kelly Subbanand Rao was honoured Arjuna Award posthumously in the year 1996 in the discipline of yachting.

Recipients

Adventure Sports

Ball Badminton

Billiards & Snooker

Bodybuilding

Carrom

Chess

Cricket

Kabaddi

Kho Kho

Lawn Bowls

Mallakhamb

Motor Sports

Mountaineering

Polo

Powerlifting

Roller Skating

Squash

Wushu

Yachting

Reference

External links
Official Website

Indian sports trophies and awards
Ministry of Youth Affairs and Sports